Irony (stylised as irony) is an album by ACO, released in 2003.
The album was produced by Sawai Taeji of portable[k]ommunity, as well as others. The single from the album, "Machi", was produced by the Icelandic electronic group Múm.

Irony reached #42 on the Oricon weekly chart, where it remained for four weeks, selling approximately 12,000 copies.

Track listing
 "00000"  – 1:19
 "赤い刺繍"  – 3:48
 "lang"  – 4:47
 "hans"  – 4:01
 "町"  – 4:02
 "裏庭"  – 5:30
 "巣箱"  – 2:32
 "irony"  – 3:17
 "空白の種"  – 5:08
 Kitchen"  – 2:13

References 

 http://www.sonymusic.co.jp/Music/Info/ACO/index2.html

2003 albums
Aco (musician) albums